UpGround is a condominium located in Bucharest at the intersection of Barbu Văcărescu and Fabrica de Glucoză streets and Şoseaua Petricani. The project also includes the seven floor class A office building BOC Tower. The tower has a gross leasable area (GLA) of  making it the largest office building in Romania.

In May 2008 the project was bought by RREEF Real Estate, the real estate branch of Deutsche Bank for €340 million making it the largest real estate transaction in Romania.

External links

Skyscraper office buildings in Bucharest
Residential skyscrapers in Bucharest
Residential buildings completed in 2010